The London Declaration was a declaration issued by the 1949 Commonwealth Prime Ministers' Conference.

London Declaration may also refer to:

 The London Declaration concerning the Laws of Naval War (1909)
 The Declaration of St James's Palace (1941)
 The London Declaration by the World Health Organization World Alliance for Patient Safety (2006)
 The London Declaration on Combating Antisemitism (2009)
 The London Declaration for Global Peace and Resistance against Extremism (2011)
 The London Declaration on Neglected Tropical Diseases (2012)

 The London Declaration issued by the Heads of State and Government participating in the meeting of the North Atlantic Council (2019)

See also 

 List of conferences in London
 London Agreement (disambiguation)
 London Protocol (disambiguation)
 Treaty of London (disambiguation)

London-related lists